St Alexander's Church, formally known as The Parish Church of St Alexander Nevsky is a church of the Estonian Apostolic Orthodox Church in Tartu, Estonia.

History
The cornerstone of the church was laid on 27 May 1914. The church was built in the Russian architecture on designs by Vladimir Lunski. The lower church was completed by the end of 1914 and was consecrated on 21 November. The church was used by the Russian and Estonian Orthodox congregations, though separately. The upper church was completed a year later and was consecrated on 26 September 1915.

Soviet Occupation
In 1940 the church was nationalised by the Soviet authorities. For decades it was used as a warehouse by the State University of Tartu and later the National Museum of Ethnography of the Estonian SSR. The church was returned to the Estonian Apostolic Orthodox Church in 1995. The church was re-consecrated in the summer of 2003 by the parish priests Vadim Rebane and deacon Timothy Vasel.

Gallery

References

20th-century churches in Estonia
Eastern Orthodox churches in Estonia
Buildings and structures in Tartu
Churches in Tartu